Torda County was a county in Transylvania between the 11th century and 1876.

History

Kingdom of Hungary

Counties (districts formed around royal fortresses) were the basic units of royal administration in the Kingdom of Hungary from the 11th century. A cemetery near the castle was used from the turn of the 10th and 11th centuries.

The earliest royal charter mentioning the castle is from 1075, but only its interpolated version has been preserved. The earliest authentic charter referring to the same castle is dated to 1177. Although the county itself was only first mentioned in 1227, a reference in the charter of 1075 to taxes levied on salt at the castle implies the existence of a system of administration. Reference to an unnamed ispán of Torda was preserved in a charter from 1221. The ispáns of Torda were appointed by the voivodes of Transylvania, the representative of the kings of Hungary in the province.

Eastern Hungarian Kingdom

Principality of Transylvania

Austria-Hungary

List of ispáns

Fourteenth century

Fifteenth century

Sixteenth century

Seventeenth century

Eighteenth century

Nineteenth century

See also
 Maros-Torda County
 Torda-Aranyos County

Footnotes

References

 Bóna, István (1994). The Hungarian–Slav Period (895–1172). In: Köpeczi, Béla; Barta, Gábor; Bóna, István; Makkai, László; Szász, Zoltán; Borus, Judit; History of Transylvania; Akadémiai Kiadó; .
 Curta, Florin (2006). Southeastern Europe in the Middle Ages, 500-1250. Cambridge University Press. .
  Engel, Pál (1996). Magyarország világi archontológiája, 1301–1457, I. [=Secular Archontology of Hungary, 1301–1457, Volume I"]. História, MTA Történettudományi Intézete. Budapest. .
 Engel, Pál (2001). The Realm of St Stephen: A History of Medieval Hungary, 895-1526. I.B. Tauris Publishers. .
  Fallenbüchl, Zoltán (1994). Magyarország főispánjai, 1526–1848 - Die Obergespane Ungarns, 1526–1848 Lord-lieutenants of counties in Hungary, 1526–1848
  Kristó, Gyula (1988). A vármegyék kialakulása Magyarországon [=Development of Counties in Hungary]. Magvető Kiadó. .
 Kristó, Gyula (2003). Early Transylvania (895-1324). Lucidus Kiadó. .
  Zsoldos, Attila (2011). Magyarország világi archontológiája, 1000–1301 ("Secular Archontology of Hungary, 1000–1301"). História, MTA Történettudományi Intézete. Budapest. .

Kingdom of Hungary counties in Transylvania